Gilbert Thompson (21 March 1839 – 8 June 1909) was an American typographer, draftsman, topographer, and soldier.

Biography

Early life and Civil War
Born on March 21, 1839, in Blackstone, Massachusetts, his father had helped combat the Dorr Rebellion in neighboring Rhode Island, and his great-grandmother was Deborah Sampson. At age ten his parents moved to the Utopian community of Hopedale, Massachusetts. In Hopedale he trained to become a printer, and his first job was as a printer's assistant in a newspaper influenced by Adin Ballou. In 1861 he left to Boston, where he enlisted into the Union Army to fight in the American Civil War. The enlistment clerk wrote his profession as painter rather than printer when he signed up. This caused him to be changed from being an infantryman to becoming a combat engineer. He joined as a private in 1862 and became a corporal in the Regular Battalion of Engineers serving until May 1865.

Wheeler Survey
After the war, Thompson went to Washington D.C., where he became associated with the U.S. Geological Survey. In 1872 he joined the Wheeler Survey, under Lieutenant George Wheeler. He would stay on the Wheeler survey for the next seven years, making friends with the likes of Henry Wetherbee Henshaw, Rogers Birnie, and William Henry Rideing. In 1875, he led an expedition to Spirit Mountain in Nevada, of which he did the first topographical sketch. In 1879 he went into the Great Basin with Grove Karl Gilbert and John Wesley Powell.

Fingerprints
Thompson claimed to have been the first person to use fingerprints for identification in 1882, when he had his thumb print on a message that said "August 8, 1882-Mr. Jonas Sutler will pay Lying Bob Seventy Five Dollar".

After the Wheeler Survey
In 1884, Thompson was made head of the Appalachian division of the U.S. Geological Survey. In 1888, he co-founded the National Geographic Society, and in 1889 provided the first map supplement for the National Geographic Magazine; "North Carolina-Tennessee-Asheville Sheet".

He was also involved in the Grand Army of the Republic, Sons of the American Revolution, General Society of the War of 1812 and the Society of Colonial Wars. He also studied genealogy, finding connections between himself and Sir Humphrey Gilbert as well as Myles Standish, and was an antiquarian.

Army Corps of Engineers
As a major, he served in the Corps of Engineers from 1890 to 1898 at the District of Columbia National Guard.

Death 
Major Gilbert Thompson died on June 8, 1909. He is buried at Arlington National Cemetery.

References

External links

Gilbert Thompson by Marcus Benjamin at Internet Archive

1839 births
1909 deaths
American explorers
National Geographic Society founders
Union Army non-commissioned officers
United States Geological Survey personnel
United States Army Corps of Engineers personnel
United States Army officers